Donald Trump, an American businessman, politician, and 45th president of the United States, has  used several pseudonyms, including "John Barron" (or "John Baron"), "John Miller" and "David Dennison". His practice of sometimes speaking to the media under the guise of a spokesperson has been described as "an open secret" at the Trump Organization and in New York media circles.

Background
A writer for Fortune reported that Trump's father, Fred Trump, had used the pseudonym Mr. Green in business dealings.

"John Barron" (1980s) 
Trump used the pseudonym "John Barron" (sometimes "John Baron") throughout the 1980s, with its earliest known usage in 1980 and its last acknowledgment in 1990. According to The Washington Post, the name was a "go-to alias when [Trump] was under scrutiny, in need of a tough front man or otherwise wanting to convey a message without attaching his own name to it." Barron would be introduced as a spokesperson for Trump.

The pseudonym first appeared in a May 7, 1980 article where "John Barron, vice president of Trump Organization" spawned rumors of a $1 billion deal to buy the World Trade Center: "I don't know if it's going to happen or not, but it is a possibility". In a June 6, 1980 New York Times article, "Barron" defended Trump's controversial destruction of sculptures on the Bonwit Teller flagship store (now the site of Trump Tower) that he had promised to the Metropolitan Museum of Art. The pseudonymous vice president acted as Trump's spokesperson for three days in that case. Trump continued to pose as "Barron" on occasion for the rest of the decade. In 1983, "Barron" told the press that Trump had decided not to purchase the Cleveland Indians.

In May 1984, "Barron" lied to then-Forbes reporter Jonathan Greenberg about Trump's wealth and assets to get Trump on the Forbes 400 list. "Barron" stated to Greenberg that "[m]ost of the assets [of Donald's father Fred Trump] have been consolidated to Mr. [Donald] Trump." In April 2018, Greenberg retrieved and made public the original audio recordings of his exchange with "Barron", and stated that "Trump, through this [Barron] sockpuppet, was telling me he owned 'in excess of 90 percent of Fred Trump's assets. Ultimately, Greenberg included Trump at the end of the Forbes 400 list at $100 million, one fifth of the $500 million which "Barron" was claiming as Donald Trump's net worth. According to Greenberg, Donald Trump was only ever worth just under $5 million, which was 5% of the net worth which was attributed to him by Forbes at the time and only 1% of what "Barron" was claiming. Greenberg has corrected the record by stating that, as revealed in court documents in proceedings years later, Donald Trump never owned any of Fred Trump's assets until 1999 after Fred's death, and even then, inheriting only his share of Fred's deceased estate, with Donald Trump's three siblings and some grandchildren beneficiaries inheriting their corresponding shares.

Also in 1984, "Barron" gave the press a positive spin on the 1984 collapse of a plan to build Trump Castle in New York. In 1985, "Barron" urged fellow United States Football League team owners to partially reimburse Trump for a high-priced player. In April 1985, "John Baron, a vice president in the Trump Organization," announced to the press that the Trump Organization had signed an agreement to buy an unopened Hilton Hotel in Atlantic City.

Some New York editors recalled that "calls from Barron were at points so common that they became a recurring joke on the city desk."

Trump stopped using the pseudonym after he was compelled to testify in court proceedings that John Barron was one of his pseudonyms. The Washington Post suggested that Trump might have used the pseudonym longer if not for the "lawsuit in which he testified, under oath in 1990, that 'I believe on occasion I used that name.

"John Miller" (1991) 

In 1991, a reporter for People attempted to interview Trump about the end of his marriage to Ivana Trump and his rumored association with other women. She was called back by a publicist who gave his name as "John Miller", who gave her a long interview about Trump's marital affairs ("He's a good guy, and he's not going to hurt anybody. ... He treated his wife well and ... he will treat Marla well."), his attractiveness to women, and his wealth. The reporter thought at the time that "Miller" sounded remarkably like Trump, and played the tape to several people who knew Trump and agreed it was Trump. She says Trump later told her it was a "joke gone awry". Trump denied that he posed as John Miller to tell People, "[Madonna] called and wanted to go out with him, that I can tell you."

In 2016, The Washington Post obtained a copy of the tape and reported that it was Trump using a pseudonym. Trump denied it, saying, "It was not me on the phone." Later, when a reporter asked Trump if he had ever employed a spokesperson named John Miller, he hung up.

"Carolin Gallego" (1992) 
A 1992 letter to New York magazine signed by "Carolin Gallego" replied to an article by Julie Baumgold. The letter asserted that "as his secretary" she knew Trump to treat women with respect. This letter resurfaced in a 2017 article in the Washingtonian which highlighted similarities between patterns of repetition in Trump's speech and the final line in the letter, which read: "I do not believe any man in America gets more calls from women wanting to see him, meet him, or go out with him. The most beautiful women, the most successful women—all women love Donald Trump." The Washingtonian was unable to find any record of a Carolin Gallego as secretary to Trump and said that it was not out of the question that Trump himself had written the letter.

"David Dennison" (2016) 
The name "David Dennison" was used as a pseudonym for Trump by his personal lawyer Michael Cohen in a 2016 pre-election non-disclosure agreement with pornographic film actress Stormy Daniels (born Stephanie Gregory Clifford and identified in the document as Peggy Peterson) regarding her allegation that she and Trump had an extramarital affair in 2006. Keith Davidson acted as Stormy Daniels’ legal representative in that agreement. A later legal representative of Daniels, Michael Avenatti, later claimed that Davidson was a double agent all along working for Trump and Cohen.

The same pseudonyms were also later used in a similar 2016 pre-election agreement involving payment for the silence of Playboy Playmate model Shera Bechard about an alleged extramarital affair, with a consequent pregnancy and subsequent abortion, between "Dennison" and "Peterson". That agreement was also drafted by Trump's personal lawyer Cohen, while Bechard was also represented by the same Keith Davidson who had negotiated Stormy Daniels’ agreement with Trump.

In Bechard's case, sources identified "Dennison" as Republican fundraiser Elliott Broidy, who then acknowledged in an ambiguously worded statement that he had a “relationship” (the nature of which was not specified) and that he made the $1.6 million payment to her after being made aware of her pregnancy. The phrasing of his statement also omitted any assertion that he was in fact the father of the unborn child. Some legal scholars and columnists have since speculated that Donald Trump was really the person who had the affair with Bechard.

In popular culture
In January 2021, after the permanent suspension of Trump's personal Twitter account, an account with the handle @barronjohn1946 was registered with the location “Not the White House” and including "Not Donald Trump" in the bio. The account is satirical, but , it had amassed 419,800 followers and more than 1.9 million likes on its first tweet.

Cartoonist Ruben Bolling occasionally satirizes Trump's use of John Barron in comics titled Donald and John: A Boy and His Imaginary Publicist. It is drawn as a homage to the comic strip Calvin and Hobbes, about a boy with a rich fantasy life.

In season 3, episode 5, of The Good Fight, which airs on CBS All Access, a character places a fake call to The Wall Street Journal using the name John Barron. This is followed by a musical interlude written by Jonathan Coulton and animated by Steve Angel explaining Trump's use of the alias.

In Don Winslow's 2019 novel The Border, the Trump-like president is named "John Dennison".

See also
 Nicknames used by Donald Trump
 Veracity of statements by Donald Trump

References

Pseudonyms
Pseudonyms